The Azerbaijan national rugby union team competes in division 3D of the European Nations Cup. Azerbaijan have yet to qualify for the Rugby World Cup.

Competitive record

Sevens
 2006 European Sevens Championship

Union
 2004–2006 European Nations Cup Third Division
 2006–2008 European Nations Cup Third Division
 2008–2010 European Nations Cup Third Division
 2010–12 European Nations Cup Third Division
 2012–2014 European Nations Cup Third Division

Record

See also
 FIRA-AER

References

External links
 Azerbaijan Rugby Federation
 Azerbaijan on rugbydata.com
 Azerbaijan on IRB.com

European national rugby union teams
Rugby union in Azerbaijan
Teams in European Nations Cup (rugby union)
Asian national rugby union teams